The common synovial sheath for the flexor tendons or the ulnar bursa  is a synovial sheath in the carpal tunnel of the human hand.

It contains tendons of the flexor digitorum superficialis and the flexor digitorum profundus, but not the flexor pollicis longus.

The sheath which surrounds the flexor digitorum extends downward about halfway along the metacarpal bones, where it ends in blind diverticula around the tendons to the index, middle, and ring fingers. It is prolonged on the tendons to the little finger and usually communicates with the mucous sheath of these tendons.

References

External links
 https://web.archive.org/web/20070814124446/http://moon.ouhsc.edu/dthompso/namics/labs/wrist2.htm

Upper limb anatomy